Jong AZ is a Dutch association football team, based in Zaandam in the Zaanstreek. It is the reserve team of AZ, based in Alkmaar, and plays in the Keuken Kampioen Divisie.

Squad

Out on loan

References 

Dutch reserve football teams
AZ Alkmaar